André Ricardo Ferreira Schutte (born 31 January 1998) is a Portuguese footballer who plays as a forward for Spanish club UD Logroñés.

Club career
Born in Ribeira Brava, Madeira, Schutte represented CD Ribeira Brava, FC Porto, EF Dragon Force and Rio Ave FC as a youth. In 2017, after finishing his formation, he was promoted to the B-team, playing in the Porto Football Association's Elite Division.

After scoring 11 goals for the B's, Schutte was promoted to the first team in July 2018, and made his professional debut on 2 August, coming on as a late substitute for Leandrinho in a 4–4 UEFA Europa League home draw against Jagiellonia Białystok. He made his Primeira Liga debut on 2 December of the following year, replacing Bruno Moreira in a 0–2 loss at SC Braga.

On 24 August 2020, Schutte moved abroad and joined Spanish Segunda División side CD Mirandés on a one-year loan.

On 21 July 2022, Schutte signed a two-year contract with UD Logroñés in the Spanish third-tier Primera Federación.

International career
Born in Portugal to a Portuguese mother and a South African father, Schutte can represent both nations internationally.

References

External links

1998 births
People from Ribeira Brava, Madeira
Portuguese people of South African descent
Portuguese sportspeople of African descent
Living people
Portuguese footballers
Association football forwards
Rio Ave F.C. players
CD Mirandés footballers
C.F. Estrela da Amadora players
UD Logroñés players
Segunda División players
Primeira Liga players
Liga Portugal 2 players
Primera Federación players
Portuguese expatriate footballers
Portuguese expatriate sportspeople in Spain
Expatriate footballers in Spain